Collett Park is a public park in Terre Haute, Vigo County, Indiana, United States.

The park was established in 1883 on a parcel of land donated to the city of Terre Haute by Josephus Collett, a railroad magnate and philanthropist. Its  of tree-filled park land are approximately two miles north of downtown Terre Haute. A Romanesque Revival pavilion was built in 1894 by architect J. Merrill Sherman.

The park's large main building with an indoor rental facility as well as outdoor shelters and restrooms. There are also football and soccer fields, a playground, horseshoe pits and tennis courts.

Collett Park was placed on the National Register of Historic Places in 1981 for its historical significance in entertainment and recreation. The neighborhood that arose around the park, now known as the Collett Park Neighborhood Historic District, was placed on the Register itself in 2004.

References

Parks in Indiana
1883 establishments in Indiana
Protected areas of Vigo County, Indiana
Historic districts on the National Register of Historic Places in Indiana
Tourist attractions in Terre Haute, Indiana
Historic districts in Terre Haute, Indiana
National Register of Historic Places in Terre Haute, Indiana
Parks on the National Register of Historic Places in Indiana